is a railway station in Ebetsu, Hokkaidō, Japan. The station is numbered A09.

Lines
Ebetsu Station is served by Hakodate Main Line.

Station layout
The station consists of one side platform and one island platform serving four tracks. The station has automated ticket machines, automated turnstiles which accept Kitaca, and a "Midori no Madoguchi" staffed ticket office.

Platforms

Adjacent stations

References

Railway stations in Hokkaido Prefecture
Railway stations in Japan opened in 1882